Metropolis Symphony for Orchestra (1988–93) by American composer Michael Daugherty is a five-movement symphony inspired by Superman comics. The entire piece was created over the span of five years with separate commissions for each movement. Individual movements may be performed separately; however, it is preferred that the 41 minute symphony be performed in its entirety. Metropolis Symphony was premiered by the New Hampshire Symphony Orchestra, James Bolle conducting, in November 1993, at the Palace Theater in Manchester, New Hampshire. A connective narrative between movements was written and read by Jack Larson, who had played Jimmy Olsen on television in The Adventures of Superman. The orchestral version without narration was premiered by the Baltimore Symphony Orchestra, David Zinman conducting, in January 1994, at the Meyerhoff Concert Hall in Baltimore, Maryland.

A new recording conducted by Giancarlo Guerrero and performed by the Nashville Symphony Orchestra was nominated in six categories for Grammy Awards of 2011. It won in the Best Orchestral Performance, Best Engineered Album, Classical and Best Classical Contemporary Composition categories.

Movements 
 I. Lex (1991)
Duration: 9 minutes
Commissioned by the Baltimore Symphony Orchestra, David Zinman, Music Director
Instrumentation: piccolo, 2 flutes, 2 oboes, English horn, 2 clarinets, bass clarinet, 2 bassoons, contrabassoon; 4 horns, 4 trumpets, 3 trombones, tuba; timpani, strings
 II. Krypton (1993)
Duration: 7 minutes
Commissioned by the New Jersey Symphony Orchestra, Leighton Smith, Conductor
Instrumentation: piccolo, 2 flutes, 3 oboes, E flat clarinet, clarinet, bass clarinet, 2 bassoons, contrabassoon; 4 horns, 4 trumpets, 3 trombones, tuba; 4 percussion; piano; strings
 III. MXYZPTLK (1988)
Duration: 7 minutes
Commissioned by Cleveland Chamber Symphony, Edwin London, Music Director
Instrumentation: 2 flute solo (II. doubles pic), 2 oboes, 2 clarinets, 2 bassoons; 2 horns, 2 trumpets, trombone; 1 or 2 percussion; synthesizer; strings
 IV. Oh, Lois! (1989)
Duration: 5 minutes
Commissioned by Cleveland Chamber Symphony, Edwin London, Music Director
Instrumentation: 2 flutes, 2 oboes, 2 clarinets, 2 bassoons; 4 horns, 3 trumpets, 3 trombones; timpani, 2 percussion; synthesizer; strings
 V. Red Cape Tango (1993)
Duration: 13 minutes
Commissioned by the Albany Symphony Orchestra, David Allan Miller, Music Director
Instrumentation: piccolo, 2 flutes, 2 oboes, English horn, 2 clarinets, bass clarinet, 2 bassoons, contrabassoon; 4 horns, 4 trumpets, 3 trombones, tuba; timpani, 4 percussion; piano; strings

Publisher: Peermusic Classical

Discography 
Metropolis Symphony - Michael Daugherty: Metropolis Symphony/Bizarro
Baltimore Symphony Orchestra, David Zinman, Conductor
London/Decca Argo 452-103-2

Metropolis Symphony - Michael Daugherty: Metropolis Symphony/Deus ex Machina
Nashville Symphony Orchestra, Giancarlo Guerrero, Conductor
Naxos American Classics 8.559635

References

External links
 Official site
 Grammy Awards: Daugherty's 'Metropolis Symphony' and Verdi's 'Requiem' top classical Grammy awards
 All Things Considered. "Superman Symphony's Surprise Grammy Nominations : NPR." NPR 10 Dec. 2010

Compositions by Michael Daugherty
1988 compositions
1989 compositions
1991 compositions
1993 compositions
Daugherty
Superman music
Music commissioned by the Baltimore Symphony Orchestra